The Regions of Mauritania are subdivided into 44 departments. The departments are listed below, by region:

Adrar Region

Atar Department
Chinguetti Department
Oujeft Department
Ouadane Department

Assaba Region

Aftout Department
Boumdeid Department
Guerou Department
Kankossa Department
Kiffa Department

Brakna Region

Aleg Department
Bababe Department
Bogué Department
M'Bagne Department
Magtar Lahjar Department

Dakhlet Nouadhibou Region

Nouadhibou Department

Gorgol Region

Kaedi Department
M'Bout Department
Maghama Department
Monguel Department

Guidimaka Region

Ould Yenge Department
Sélibaby Department

Hodh Ech Chargui Region

Amourj Department
Bassikounou Department
Djigueni Department
Néma Department
Oualata Department
Timbedra Department

Hodh El Gharbi Region

Ayoun el Atrous Department
Kobenni Department
Tamchekket Department
Tintane Department

Inchiri Region

Akjoujt Department

Nouakchott-Nord Region

Dar-Naim Department
Teyarett Department
Toujouonine Department

Nouakchott-Ouest Region

Ksar Department
Sebkha Department
Tevragh-Zeina Department

Nouakchott-Sud Region

Arafat Department
El Mina Department
Riyad Department

Tagant Region

Moudjeria Department
Tichit Department
Tidjikja Department

Tiris Zemmour Region

Bir Moghrein Department
Fderîck Department
Zouérat Department

Trarza Region

Boutilimit Department
Keur Massene Department
Mederdra Department
Ouad Naga Department
R'Kiz Department
Rosso Department

References

See also

Regions of Mauritania
Geography of Mauritania

 
Subdivisions of Mauritania
Mauritania, Departments
Mauritania 2
Departments, Mauritania
Mauritania geography-related lists